Inge Israel (July 16, 1927 - August 5, 2019) was a Canadian poet and playwright who wrote in French and English.

Early life

Inge Israel (née Margulies) was born in Frankfurt, Germany in 1927. The rise of the Nazism in Germany led to her parents escaping with her to France. She has also lived in Ireland and Denmark.

She met her husband, physicist Werner Israel in Dublin, Ireland, and in 1958 they moved to Edmonton, Alberta in Canada. They later moved to Victoria, British Columbia in 1996.

Awards

The recipient of several poetry prizes, Inge Israel was named Chevalier de l'Ordre des Arts et des Lettres in 1998.

Her play, Pensées Inédites was broadcast on Radio Canada and several stories and poetry cycles were broadcast on the CBC and the BBC. In addition to readings of her poetry in Canada, Europe and Japan, Inge Israel has given dramatized presentations of her plays in Canada and Japan.

Works

Books

- Réflexions, poetry (French), Ed. St.Germain-des-Prés, Paris, 1978. 
- Même le Soleil a des Taches, poetry, Ed. St.Germain-des-Prés, 1980. 
- Aux Quatre Terres, poetry (French), Ed. du Vermillon, Ottawa, 1990. 
- Raking Zen Furrows, poetry, Ronsdale Press, Vancouver, 1991. 
- Unmarked Doors, poetry, Ronsdale Press, Vancouver, 1992. 
- Le Tableau Rouge, short stories (French), Ed. du Vermillon, 1997. 
- Rifts in the Visible/Fêlures dans le Visible  poetry (bilingual), Ronsdale Press, 1997. 
-  Ucho no Samon, Japanese translation of Raking Zen Furrows, Bungeisha Press, Japan, 2007. 
- Beckett Soundings, poetry, Ronsdale Press, to be published in March 2011.  
- Finding the Words, autobiography, Niagara: Seraphim Editions 2016.

Plays

- Clean Breast, drama in 2 acts, Questex, 1999. 
- The Unwritten Letters/Wild Rhythm, 2 dramas, Questex, 1999. 
- Philosophy & Other Catastrophes, play, Questex, 2005.

Essays, plays, and poetry published in anthologies

- L'ouest en Nouvelles, Editions des Plaines, 1986. 
- Sous le Soleil de L'ouest, Ed. des Plaines, 1988. 
- Iwanami Shoten, Tokyo, Japan, 1993.
- Eating Apples, NeWest Press, Edmonton, AB, 1994. 
- Littérature et culture francophones de Colombie-Britannique, Les Editions David, 2004. 
- Sweet Lemons 2, Legas of Mineola, New York & Ottawa, 2010.

References

2019 deaths
German poets
20th-century Canadian poets
21st-century Canadian poets
Canadian women poets
20th-century Canadian women writers
21st-century Canadian women writers
Women dramatists and playwrights
German women essayists
German essayists
20th-century essayists
21st-century essayists
1927 births
Chevaliers of the Ordre des Arts et des Lettres